Colonel John Folliott or Ffolliott, of Ballymacward (1660–1697) was an Irish politician.

He was the eldest son of John Ffolliott of Ballyshannon by his wife Johanna, daughter of Dr Edward Synge; Francis Folliott, M.P. was his younger brother. He sat in the Irish House of Commons for Ballyshannon from 1692 to 1693. He was the father of John Folliot.

References

1660 births
1697 deaths
Irish MPs 1692–1693
Members of the Parliament of Ireland (pre-1801) for County Donegal constituencies